Erica Dittmer (born September 15, 1991), also known as Erica Dittmer Cane, is an American-born Mexican breaststroke, freestyle and medley swimmer who studied and trained at Texas A&M University, and attended Klein High School.

Born in Harris County, Texas, she holds dual American and Mexican citizenship due to her mother being an American who was born in Mexico. She swam at the 2012 Summer Olympics, representing Mexico in the 200 m individual medley.

See also
 Fernanda González, 2012 Olympic teammate.
 Patricia Castañeda Miyamoto, 2012 Olympic teammate.

References 

1991 births
Living people
Sportspeople from Harris County, Texas
Mexican female breaststroke swimmers
Mexican female freestyle swimmers
Mexican female medley swimmers
Olympic swimmers of Mexico
Swimmers at the 2012 Summer Olympics
Texas A&M Aggies women's swimmers
American emigrants to Mexico
American sportspeople of Mexican descent